Pope Gregory XII (r. 1406–1415) created 14 cardinals in 2 consistories he held during his pontificate; this included his future successor Pope Eugene IV.

9 May 1408
 Antonio Correr Can. Reg. O.S.A.
 Gabriele Condulmer Can. Reg. O.S.A.
 Giovanni Dominici O.P.
 Giacopo del Torso

19 September 1408
 Ludovico Bonito
 Angelo Cino
 Angelo Barbarigo
 Bandello Bandelli
 Philip Repington Can. Reg. O.S.A.
 Matthäus von Krakau
 Luca Manzoli O.Hum.
 Vicente de Ribas O.S.B.
 Pietro Morosini iuniore
 Ottaviano Ottaviani

Notes and references

Sources

College of Cardinals
Gregory XII